Aino Emilia Thauvón-Suits (November 9, 1884, in Haapajärvi – August 8, 1969, in Gothenburg) was a Finnish author and translator, best known for her novels Tuntemani Eino Leino – kärsivä ihminen (1958) and Gustav Suitsu noorus: kirjade, luuletuste ja mälestuste põhjal (1997). She was married to Gustav Suits.

References 

1884 births
1968 deaths
Finnish writers